BIBS may refer to:

 A Built-In Breathing System, a source of breathable gas for emergencies
 The Bath Investment and Building Society, a British financial institution
 The Beanstalk International Bilingual School system, based in Beijing, China